Anaerococcus tetradius is a bacterium from the family Peptoniphilaceae. It  was first isolated from vaginal discharges and ovarian abscesses, but is a common member of the vaginal flora.

Biochemistry
A. tetradius can ferment glucose and mannose.

References

Bacteria described in 1983
Eubacteriales